Beirut Art Residency is a non-profit artist-run interdisciplinary residency based in Beirut, Lebanon.

History and program 
Beirut Art Residency was founded in 2015 by Amar A. Zahr. It offers a two-month residency programme to as many as four artists at a time. The artist-in-residence program aims to stimulate creativity through interaction with the local environment, artists and cultural institutions, and seeks to foster cross-cultural relations between participants and the local artistic community in Beirut. The program strives to instigate dialogue between artists from various disciplines including:  Visual Arts, Concept & Theory, Design, Film & Video, Installation,  Music & Sound, Performance, Photography and Curatorial research.

Residencies are typically removed from the city and isolated, so setting up the space in the middle of Beirut serves a different purpose. The residency aims to build its own community through interaction and engagement, providing a platform for communication and exchange between the invited artists and the Lebanese art scene. With the residency's relatively short-term program, more artists are able to benefit.

The selection is made by a jury made up of local and international art practitioners including artist Ziad Antar, The Third Line gallery co-founder and director Sunny Rahbar, Protocinema founder Mari Spirito, Art Historian/Photographer Gregory Buchakjian and Curator/Writer Myriam Ben Salah. On the advisory board of the organization sit Canvas Magazine founder Ali Khadra, Middle Eastern Art collector Khaled Jalanbo,

Beirut Art Residency is located in Gemmayze, Beirut's bohemian quarter dotted with art galleries and cultural centers.

Past residents 
 Phase I (September - October 2015):   Sara Naim  Athier Mousawi
 Phase II (October - November 2015):  Ivana Ivkovic  Lucienne Bestall  Pierre Dalpé
 Phase III (January - February 2016):  Ibi Ibrahim  Lara Ögel  Evelyn Simons
 Phase IV (April - May 2016): Mary Ann Peters, Naomi Moser, Amor Herrera
 Phase V (June - July 2016): Dexter Davey, Isaac Blease, Sumiah Salloum, Asiya Alsharabi
 Phase VI (September - October 2016): Gianna Dispenza, Darryl Westly
 Phase VII (November - December 2016): Rehan Miskci, Nicolas Courdy, Ragnheidur Gestsdottir
 Phase VIII (January - March 2017): Abdelkader Benchamma, Hilda Ekeroth, Esmeralda Kosmatopoulos

Local collaborations 
 'Safe Sounds II' a progressive sound installation in collaboration with Ziad Antar
 'Untitled' a live performance by musician/sound artist Charbel Haber
 'Aftertaste' exhibition of works by emerging Lebanese artist Christopher Rizkallah

La Vitrine 
One artist is selected every two months to showcase new work for Beirut Art Residency's street-level project space. Each artist is given a budget in support of the production and implementation of their site-specific intervention.
La Vitrine is open to artists of all disciplines extending to sound installations, sculptures, photography, performance and others. Curators may also be invited to stage an intervention.
The realized installation will be revealed in La Vitrine with an accompanying text highlighting the name of the exhibiting artist as well as the title and medium of the artwork. La Vitrine is an innovative and unconventional exhibition space unveiling new art, artists, and concepts while encouraging the audience to deduct their own interpretations.
www.beirutartresidency.com/lavitrine

Management 
Amar A. Zahr, Founder and co-Director
Nathalie Ackawi, Partner and co-Director
Christopher Rizkallah, Design and Comms Manager
Colette Mahoney, Residency Manager

References 

Non-profit organisations based in Lebanon
Arts organisations based in Lebanon